Cheeriyal or Cheeryal is a village in Medchal-Malkajgiri district in Telangana, India. It falls under Keesara mandal.

References

Villages in Ranga Reddy district